Mount Frödin is a mountain, about  high, rising  east-southeast of Waterboat Point, Paradise Harbor, on Danco Coast, Antarctica. The feature was originally called "Mount Lunch-Ho!" by T.W. Bagshawe and M.C. Lester, because on the first ascent in 1921 lunch was eaten on the summit. It was renamed by the Chilean Antarctic Expedition (1950–51) after Swedish engineer Bertil Frödin, who conducted geological and glaciological studies on the expedition.

References

Mountains of Graham Land
Danco Coast